The 1888–89 season was Stoke's first season in the Football League, Stoke becoming one of the 12 founder members.

There was a major change to English football in 1888–89 following the formation of the Football League. Stoke successfully joined the league along with 11 other professional football clubs. Managed by Harry Lockett Stoke struggled throughout the season and ended up finishing bottom of the table after managing just four victories.

Season review

League
Prior to the 1888–89 season clubs played in friendlies, Staffordshire Senior Cup and in the FA Cup which Stoke entered for the first time in 1883. However once a team has been knocked out of the cup there was little excitement for players and supporters and so a league format was advocated by the chairman of Aston Villa, William McGregor and in the spring of 1888 the Football League was formed with McGregor as its first president. Harry Lockett represented Stoke at the meeting in Anderton's Hall Hotel, London and was successful as three weeks later Stoke joined the league and Lockett was appointed as the league's first secretary which he went on to occupy from 1888 to 1902.
Stoke's first league match was at the Victoria Ground against midlands rivals and FA Cup holders West Bromwich Albion. A crowd in excess of 4,500 attended the contest which was won 2–0 by the visitors thanks to late goals from Joe Wilson and George Woodhall which meant that the "Baggies" were the first side to be top of the table.

Stoke had the misfortune to finish bottom of the table, albeit on goal-average at the end of the first league season after only winning 4 of their 22 matches. These were 3–0 both home and away over Notts County the team who finished level on points with Stoke, 4–3 v Burnley and 2–1 against Blackburn Rovers. Frank Staton had the honour of scoring the club's first league goal which came in a 5–1 loss at Aston Villa. Stoke's first win was against Notts County on 22 September with two goals from Billy Tunncliffe and a strike from the clubs first Scottish player Bob McSkimming who went on be the leading goalscorer with six. Stoke's heaviest defeat was a 7–0 loss away at the eventual winners of both League and cup Preston North End. Two Stoke players failed to board the train on the morning of that game at Deepdale and so Preston agreed to loan two of their reserves (Bill Smalley and Alfred Dempsey) to make up the numbers. Alf Underwood and Bob McSkimming were Stoke's only ever-presents and Bill Rowley only missed one game. Stoke successfully applied for re-election to along with Burnley, Derby County and Notts County.

FA Cup
On the same day as the first qualifying round Stoke's first team had an away match against Preston North End so Stoke's reserve side, the Stoke Swifts played the FA Cup tie against Warwick County which they lost 2–1.

Final league table

</onlyinclude>

Results

Stoke's score comes first

Legend

Football League

FA Cup

Squad statistics

References

Stoke City F.C. seasons
Stoke